The time trial is one of two road bicycle racing events held at the Summer Olympics, the other being the road race. The time trial has individual starts in intervals. The men's time trials was first held at the 1912, and then again in 1996 Summer Olympics after professional and amateur cycling made a resurgence in popularity. The women's event was first contested at the 1996 Summer Olympics. The women's individual time trial was introduced in 1996, and has been run ever since.

Medalists

Men 

Medalists by country after Summer Olympic Tokyo 2020

Women 

Medalists by country after Summer Olympic Tokyo 2020

References

Cycling at the Summer Olympics
Cycling at the Summer Olympics – Men's individual time trial
Cycle sport